Jake Highfill (born March 3, 1990) is the former Iowa State Representative from the 39th District. A Republican, he served in the Iowa House of Representatives from 2013 - 2018.  Highfill resides in Johnston, Iowa.  He has a bachelor's degree in business from the University of Iowa.

Highfill served on several committees in the Iowa House – the Appropriations, Local Government, and Natural Resources committees.  He also served as the vice chair of the State Government committee and was a member of the Education Appropriations Subcommittee.  Highfill defeated incumbent Erik Helland, the House majority whip, to win the Republican nomination in 2012.

In March, 2017, Highfill admitted keeping a "blacklist" of people in his constituency who disagreed with him.

Highfill was defeated by Democrat Karin Derry in the November 6, 2018 general election.

Electoral history 
*incumbent

References

External links 

 Representative Jake Highfill official Iowa General Assembly site
 
 Financial information (state office) at the National Institute for Money in State Politics

1990 births
Living people
University of Iowa alumni
Republican Party members of the Iowa House of Representatives
People from Johnston, Iowa
21st-century American politicians